The Metropolitan Municipality of Lima is the local government entity of the Lima Province and Lima District. It is the only provincial municipality of special regime with faculties of regional government. It is established according to the 2002 Organic Law of Regional Governments and the 2003 Organic Law of Municipalities.

Organization 
The organs of the Metropolitan Municipality of Lima are:

 the Council;
 the Mayor of Lima; and
 the Metropolitan Assembly.

The Council consists of the Mayor and five aldermen, according to the Municipal Elections Law. The Metropolitan Assembly is an advisory and coordinating body.

Function and powers 
According to Article 154 of, the Metropolitan Municipality of Lima exerts jurisdiction, in matters within its competence, on the districts of Lima.

References 

 Ley Orgánica de Municipalidades (Organic Law of Municipalities), Ley Nº 27972, published in El Peruano on 27 May 2003.

External links 
 Municipalidad Metropolitana de Lima 

Lima Province